The Simpsons Wrestling is a sports video game based on the animated television series The Simpsons. Developed by Big Ape Productions and published by Activision (Electronic Arts in Europe) for the PlayStation, it was first released in Europe in March 2001, followed by North America a month later. It is the only Simpsons video game released for the PlayStation.

The Simpsons Wrestling features 20 playable characters, voiced by the series' regular voice cast, each of whom executes their own exclusive moves, gestures, and power moves in the wrestling ring. The matches take place in detailed 3D locations in Springfield. A round in the game ends when one wrestler pins their opponent for a three count; two wins constitute a victory. Unlike in traditional wrestling rules, the opponent may be pinned belly-down.

The game was widely panned by critics, and has since been considered by many to be one of the worst video games of all time, though the audio track was praised.

Gameplay

The Simpsons Wrestling is loosely based on professional wrestling games, but more closely resembles a beat-'em up. The game can be played in two modes: a tournament style single-player game or a grudge match where two players can interact. The matches take place in ten different detailed 3D locations from Springfield, such as the Simpsons' house, the Springfield Nuclear Power Plant, the Kwik-E-Mart, and Moe's Tavern. Letters float around in the wrestling ring, and if a wrestler collects enough of them, they can taunt and temporarily become invincible. A round ends when one wrestler pins their opponent for a three count. Two rounds are needed to win a match.

Each time a successful attack is performed on a player, their health meter depletes. Players with low health stay stunned for longer when knocked down. A player can increase their health by picking up food items that randomly appear in the ring. Running and attacks drain stamina. If a player does not have enough stamina to perform a certain move, it becomes unavailable until they recover. Stamina is regained through not pressing the actions buttons or picking up certain items. Attacks which require more stamina are generally more effective. The stun meter only appears when the opponent is knocked down. It depletes gradually, but the stunned player cannot move until the Stun meter is completely drained. A player can reduce the stun meter faster by pressing the action buttons, or by receiving certain attacks. If a player is low on health, the stun meter will normally be higher, making pin attempts harder to resist. Once a player's health is completely depleted, it will only take one hit to stun them. Certain attacks to a stunned opponent will actually reset the stun meter.

During matches, wrestlers have a health meter that drains as they perform special moves, and gradually refills when they are not attacking. Different moves use up different amounts of energy, and certain characters can win any match by repeatedly using a particularly damaging move that does not require much energy. Several different power-ups are also available in the game, including a donut that increases speed, bowling pins that can be used as clubs, and bubble gum that slows players down.

In addition to health items, the letters A, U, N, and T appear randomly in the ring. If either player collects enough to spell the word "TAUNT", they can then perform a taunt. The taunt will completely drain the opponent's stamina, making them unable to attack for a limited time.

Various characters make cameos as background images. Each character executes their own exclusive moves and gestures.

Development
Big Ape Productions developed The Simpsons Wrestling. At the Electronic Entertainment Expo in 2000, Fox Interactive announced its plans to produce and publish the game for the PlayStation console. Karly Young, director of Fox Interactive, said that the company had received an "overwhelming" response to their previous Simpsons games, so they wanted to give the fans "another dose of Bart and Homer—this time for PlayStation gamers".

The following months, Fox Interactive looked to partner with somebody who could help publish the game. Activision, who knew the possible casual gamer interest in The Simpsons, announced on March 12, 2001, that it had signed a deal with Fox Interactive that would allow it to publish The Simpsons Wrestling in North America. Kathy Vrabeck, executive vice president of Activision, commented that "The Simpsons is a property that enjoys phenomenal success across several entertainment mediums, including interactive entertainment. The acquisition of this game reinforces our strategy of delivering products based on powerful, recognizable brands."

Reception

The Simpsons Wrestling received "generally unfavorable" reviews, according to review aggregator Metacritic. They criticized the game for having simplistic, unbalanced gameplay and bad graphics, but praised the game's audio track.

Doug Perry of IGN described The Simpsons Wrestling as one of the "ugliest" games he had ever seen and declared it "the most horrific demolition of a license ever". He thought the graphics were "choppy" looking, and the character outlines looked "broken up". Game Informer'''s Andrew Reiner criticized the game's design by saying that he did not think it held any wrestling qualities at all, and that the characters looked "awful". He said that instead of "grappling" or performing "devastating slams", you have to "slap your opponent silly" by mashing the buttons redundantly. GameZone, however, called the graphics "quite good, though a little clipped at times by the pace of the combat". Perry also thought there was little wrestling in the game, instead it is "all about smashing buttons and not having any skill whatsoever". Reiner said that the game was a major disappointment and is "one of the worst PS games to date".

Scott Steinberg reviewed the PlayStation version of the game for Next Generation, rating it one star out of five, and stated that "A horrific, licensed beat-'em up that's so terrible it will actually make you grateful most companies opt for kart racers instead."

In contrast to the game's negative response, GameZone said that even though the game does not feature continuous play, "the action flows well once into an event". GameZone's review praised the game's audio track, and thought it was "fun" because the comedy is straight from the television show, and the characters will "bring a smile to your face". Reiner also commented positively on the soundtrack and that the game may not be the best wrestling game available, "but it delivers what the cover advertises". GameSpot's Frank Provo said that "wit" and "charm" are the two most redeeming features of The Simpsons Wrestling, and in spite of the game's weak gameplay, it has "plenty of laughs in store" that devoted fans of The Simpsons will enjoy. The BBC's David Gibbon wrote that the result of the track is one that will not "fail to impress fans".The Simpsons Wrestling'' received a "Gold" sales award from the Entertainment and Leisure Software Publishers Association (ELSPA), indicating sales of at least 200,000 copies in the United Kingdom.

See also

List of licensed wrestling video games

References

External links

2001 video games
Activision games
Electronic Arts games
Fox Interactive games
PlayStation (console) games
PlayStation (console)-only games
Professional wrestling games
Wrestling
Multiplayer and single-player video games
Video games set in the United States
Video games developed in the United States
Video games with cel-shaded animation